The Saudi Second Division is the Third level football competition in Saudi Arabia. Qualified three teams to Saudi First Division.

External links 
 Saudi Arabia Football Federation 
 Saudi League Statistics

Saudi Second Division seasons
1997–98 in Saudi Arabian football